The Winfield State League was a rugby league football competition in Queensland, Australia. It was administered by the Queensland Rugby League. The competition was the QRL's parallel to the NSWRL's Amco Cup knockout and ran alongside the Brisbane Rugby League club competition. The competition was formed in 1982 and ran until 1995, after which it was superseded by the Queensland Cup.

Formats
The Winfield State League was held in two different formats, with draw variances almost annually regardless of format towards the end of the tournament's run in the last 1980s and 1990s.

Club-based
In 1982 the competition involved the clubs from the Brisbane Rugby League competition playing representative teams from throughout the state over seven rounds with one or more finals being played to determine the competition winner. This format remained largely intact until 1988 when it was determined that the results of Brisbane club matches would go towards the State League instead of separate matches being played.

The club-based format was completely scrapped in 1991, but reinstated in 1993. The number of country teams competing was dramatically increased in 1993.

Representative-based
In 1991 and 1992 the competition was wholly representative-based. In the place of the Brisbane clubs were two representative teams: the Brisbane Capitals and the Brisbane Metros. Representative teams from throughout Queensland continued to compete, in addition to a team from the Northern Territory.

Winfield State League grand final results

Source:

Competing teams 1982–1995

Source:

Sources
 Winfield State League Results (via archive.org)

See also

 Rugby league in Queensland
 Brisbane Rugby League
 Queensland Cup
 Queensland Rugby League

References

External links

Defunct rugby league competitions in Queensland